Sangavadi River is a river in western India in Gujarat whose origin is Gir forest. Its drainage basin has a maximum length of 38 km. The total catchment area of the basin is 576 km2.

References

Rivers of Gujarat
Rivers of India